The Eugene Hotel is a historic hotel building in Eugene, Oregon, United States.

The hotel was added to the National Register of Historic Places in 1982. In 1983, the building was adapted for use as retirement housing.

See also
National Register of Historic Places listings in Lane County, Oregon

References

External links

1925 establishments in Oregon
Hotel buildings completed in 1925
Hotel buildings on the National Register of Historic Places in Eugene, Oregon